Keith Edward Starr (born March 14, 1954) is an American former professional basketball player. He played in 17 games during the 1976–77 season for the Chicago Bulls after a collegiate career at the University of Pittsburgh. Starr also played briefly in the Continental Basketball Association in 1982–83 with the Las Vegas Silvers.

References

1954 births
Living people
People from Sewickley, Pennsylvania
Basketball players from Pennsylvania
Chicago Bulls draft picks
Chicago Bulls players
Las Vegas Silvers players
Pittsburgh Panthers men's basketball players
Shooting guards
Sportspeople from the Pittsburgh metropolitan area
American men's basketball players